The North Hill Preservation District is a U.S. historic district (designated as such on May 9, 1983) located in Pensacola, Florida. The district is bounded by Blount, Palafox, Wright, Belmont, Reus, and DeVilliers Streets. It contains 425 historic buildings and 1 object.

See also
Historical Marker Database

References

External links

 Escambia County listings at National Register of Historic Places

Pensacola, Florida
National Register of Historic Places in Escambia County, Florida
Historic districts on the National Register of Historic Places in Florida